The Medal for the Campaign of 1936−1939 (Spanish: Medalla de la Campaña 1936−1939) was a Spanish military decoration. The medal was established in 1937 and awarded to those who fought on the Nationalist side during the Spanish Civil War.

Notable recipients

Spanish Civil War
 Günther Lützow (Condor Legion)
 Wolfram von Richthofen (Condor Legion)

Spanish campaign medals
Military awards and decorations of the Spanish Civil War
Awards established in 1937
1937 establishments in Spain